Cop Out is a 2010 American buddy cop action comedy film directed and edited by Kevin Smith, written by Mark and Robb Cullen (marking the first and only Smith-directed movie he did not write), and stars Bruce Willis and Tracy Morgan with Adam Brody, Kevin Pollak, Guillermo Diaz and Seann William Scott in supporting roles. The plot revolves around two veteran NYPD partners (Willis and Morgan) on the trail of a stolen, rare, mint-condition baseball card who find themselves up against a memorabilia-obsessed gangster.

Cop Out was released on February 26, 2010, by Warner Bros. Pictures. It is Smith's highest-grossing film, earning $55 million on a $30 million budget, but earned negative reviews from critics.

Plot
James "Jimmy" Monroe and Paul Hodges are veteran NYPD street detectives. After failing to stop a holdup at a cell phone store, allowing the suspect to get away, and putting civilians in danger by engaging in a reckless shootout, both Jimmy and Paul are suspended without pay pending a full investigation of their conduct.

Jimmy's daughter Ava is getting married, and Jimmy realizes he does not have the $50,000 the event will cost. His ex-wife Pam's arrogant second husband, Roy, offers to pay for the wedding, but Jimmy refuses and decides to sell his most prized possession, a one-of-a-kind 1952 baseball card, to come up with the money. The pawnshop is robbed by career criminal Dave, who takes the card. Finding out Dave is planning to rob a house that night, they stake it out to retrieve the card. Jimmy and Paul arrest Dave but find out that he already sold the card to drug dealer Poh Boy, who is obsessed with rare baseball memorabilia. 

Jimmy and Paul go to see Poh Boy and cut a deal, agreeing to retrieve a stolen car on the dealer's behalf. They discover a woman named Gabriela in the trunk. Gabriela explains that she is the mistress of Poh Boy's top rival, who was murdered by his gang and tied up as a present for their boss. Jimmy previews the tape from a hidden camera Paul had installed in his home and sees what looks to be Paul's wife Debbie with another man. He tells Paul that there is not anything on the tape, but Paul watches it himself anyway and is heartbroken. Gabriela runs off and is subsequently captured and brought to Poh Boy.

Jimmy bails out Dave and forces him to get the card back, but he accidentally falls out of a tree and hits his head, rending him comatose. Jimmy then breaks into Poh Boy's hideout only to be surrounded by the gang. At the same time, Paul learns that Debbie tricked him by faking an affair after finding his camera. After killing most of the gang in another shootout, Jimmy and Paul find Poh Boy holding Gabriela at gunpoint. They shoot him dead, but Paul's bullet goes through Jimmy's baseball card in Poh Boy's shirt pocket. Impressed with the duo's initiative and inadvertently assisting two colleagues caught up in the shootout, the precinct chief restores Jimmy and Paul to active duty, awarding them both commendations.

Crestfallen at the destruction of his prize card, Jimmy is left with no choice but to let Roy pay for the wedding. His humiliation is only furthered when Pam insists that both her husband and her ex give Ava away. Jimmy says nothing about it, but Paul discreetly aims a gun at Roy and forces him to sit down when the priest asks for Ava to be given away, letting his partner and friend have the moment to himself.

In a post-credits scene, a morgue worker rolls a gurney holding a body bag into the room as the phone rings. She hears grunts from the bag, and opens it revealing a still-alive Dave, who jokingly scares her.

Cast

 Bruce Willis as Detective Jimmy Monroe
 Tracy Morgan as Detective Paul Hodges
 Adam Brody as Barry Mangold
 Kevin Pollak as Hunsaker
 Guillermo Diaz as Poh Boy
 Seann William Scott as Dave
 Sean Cullen as Captain Jack Romans
 Jason Lee as Roy
 Rashida Jones as Debbie Hodges
 Adrian Martinez as Tino
 Cory Fernandez as Juan Diaz
 Michelle Trachtenberg as Ava Monroe
 Francie Swift as Pam
 Ana de la Reguera as Gabriela
 Jim Norton as George
 Marcus I. Morton as Tommy

Production

Initially titled A Couple of Dicks, the spec script by Mark and Robb Cullen made it onto the 2008 "Black List"of popular scripts. The title went through various name changes before release, first as A Couple of Cops and then to Cop Out, with the final title emerging from Smith's belief that changing the original title was a "cop out". The film marks the first movie that Smith directed that he did not write.

The studio requested Smith to storyboard the entire film; Smith agreed, and he and Dave Klein, the director of photography, reviewed the results with Warner Bros. two months in advance. Filming began on June 2, 2009 in New York City and finished on August 14, 2009, for a February 26, 2010 release. Smith took a pay cut in order to work on the film, which he wanted to do because of Bruce Willis's involvement. Ultimately, the film cost Warner Bros. $37 million to produce.

On-set conflicts
On the January 17, 2011 episode of WTF with Marc Maron, Smith discussed his disappointment with working with Bruce Willis and his satisfaction with working with Tracy Morgan during the making of Cop Out. Smith stated that one of the reasons that he agreed to direct the film was because he wanted to work with Willis, but that Willis "wouldn't even sit for a fucking poster shoot" and that "were it not for Tracy, I might have killed either myself or someone else in the making of fucking Cop Out."

A talent rep associated with the production of the film reported conflicts on set between Smith and Willis, saying of Smith, "He smokes way too much pot. He sat behind his monitor. He didn't interact with the actors. The actors felt they were on their own." Smith defended his use of marijuana while working, saying, "I dealt with every actor who wanted to be dealt with on that set" and pointed to the number of projects he worked on while making Cop Out to counter claims he was unproductive because of marijuana. Smith admitted in an interview that heavy marijuana-smoking had become an integral part of his work ethic after claiming that he watched actor Seth Rogen on the set of Zack and Miri Make a Porno (2008) use marijuana as a tool to become a more creative and productive worker, saying, "The moment I start smoking, I start working.... That way, no one could ever take it away from you."

In March 30, 2022, Smith apologized for his past comments about Willis following the news of Willis' retirement from acting due to aphasia complications.

Release

Marketing
The first trailer for the film was released on December 23, 2009, and then attached to Sherlock Holmes. A red band trailer was also released on February 5, 2010. The film was also advertised extensively in the United States during NBC's coverage of the 2010 Winter Olympic Games.

Theatrical
Cop Out was released theatrically in the United States on February 26, 2010, by Warner Bros. Pictures.

Home media
In May 2010, DVD and Blu-ray Disc editions of the film were announced for release on July 20, 2010. In July of that year, Cop Out was the #1 selling DVD in the US.

Reception

Box office
Cop Out grossed $44.9 million in the United States and Canada and $7.4 million in other territories for a worldwide total of $55.4 million, against its production budget of $30 million.

The film opened #2 behind Shutter Island, earning $18.2 million its opening weekend.

Critical response
Review aggregator Rotten Tomatoes gave the film an approval rating of 18% based on 163 reviews and an average rating of 3.90/10. The site's critical consensus reads, "Cop Out is a cliched buddy action/comedy that suffers from stale gags and slack pacing." On Metacritic, the film had an average score of 31 out of 100 based on 35 critics, indicating "generally unfavorable reviews". Audiences polled by CinemaScore gave the film an average grade of "B−" on an A+ to F scale.

Roger Ebert gave the film 1.5 out of 4 and wrote: "Many of the gags possibly looked good on paper, but watching Willis and Morgan struggle with them is like watching third graders do Noel Coward, if Noel Coward had been rewritten by Kevin Smith."
The film was later compared to The Other Guys, a buddy cop comedy film which was released several months afterwards and was better received by critics; Stephen Whitty of The Star-Ledger said in his review of the latter film, "Measured against this year’s other police farce – remember Cop Out? – it looks absolutely heroic."

Smith's reaction to critics
In response to the critical drubbing Cop Out received, Smith lashed out at the community of film critics on his Twitter account saying, "Writing a nasty review for Cop Out is akin to bullying a retarded kid. All you've done is make fun of something that wasn't doing you any harm and wanted only to give some cats some fun laughs." Smith also implied on Twitter that he may charge critics for advance screenings of his films, a service which has typically been provided free; this subsequently ignited a strong response from some critics condemning his stance as "dishonest" and "disingenuous".
Critic Roger Ebert, responding to Smith, tweeted, "Kevin Smith thinks critics should have had to pay to see Cop Out. But Kev, then they would REALLY have hated it."

References

External links

 
 
 
 
 
 
 

2010 films
2010 action comedy films
2010s buddy comedy films
American action comedy films
American buddy cop films
American police detective films
Fictional portrayals of the New York City Police Department
Films about the New York City Police Department
Films directed by Kevin Smith
Films produced by Marc E. Platt
Films scored by Harold Faltermeyer
Films set in New York City
Films shot in New York City
2010s police comedy films
Warner Bros. films
Buddy comedy films
2010s buddy cop films
2010 comedy films
Films produced by Polly Cohen Johnsen
2010s English-language films
2010s American films